Mao Yijun (born 28 December 1970) is a former Chinese footballer.

Club career
Mao spent his entire career with hometown club Shanghai Shenhua, winning the 1995 Jia-A League, 1998 Chinese FA Cup and the 1995 and 1998 editions of the Chinese FA Super Cup during his eight-year career at the club.

International career
On 4 May 1997, Mao made his debut for China in a 4–1 win against Turkmenistan.

International goals
Scores and results list China's goal tally first.

Coaching career
Following his retirement, Mao took up an assistant coaching role with Shanghai Shenhua from 2003 to 2006, taking up an interim managerial role from January to March 2004, before Howard Wilkinson's appointment. In September 2009, after a brief spell back as assistant manager of Shanghai Shenhua in 2008, Yijun was appointed assistant manager of Huangzhou Greentown. In July 2012, Mao returned to Shanghai Shenhua's coaching team.

References

1970 births
Living people
Footballers from Shanghai
Association football defenders
Chinese footballers
Chinese football managers
China international footballers
Shanghai Shenhua F.C. players
Shanghai Shenhua F.C. managers
Chinese Super League managers
Association football coaches
Shanghai Shenhua F.C. non-playing staff